Borsoniidae  is a monophyletic family of small to medium-sized sea snails, marine gastropod mollusks in the superfamily Conoidea.

In 2011, Bouchet, Kantor et al. brought genera from the subfamilies Clathurellinae and Raphitominae  (they were previously placed in the family Conidae), as well as genera from the subfamily Zemaciinae (at that point belonging to the family Turridae), together to form the family Borsoniidae. This re-arrangement was based on anatomical characters and a dataset of molecular sequences of three gene fragments

Description
This family is a rather heterogenous group, with wide-ranging varieties in their properties. The medium- to large-sized shells are fusiform to biconic in shape. Their size has a wide range (between 5 mm and 80 mm). The shell can be longitudinally coarsely ribbed, but axial ribs are sometimes obsolete to absent. The smooth columella has a strong (one to three plicae) to obsolete plication upon the middle. This plication varies within genera. In the genus Cordiera there are two columellar plaits. The aperture is elliptical to oval in shape and it has a short to moderately long (e.g. Zemacies excelsa)  siphonal canal and a deep anal sinus. The anterior canal has a moderate length and is slightly twisted to the left. The thin outer lip is arcuate. The vestigial or fully developed operculum has a terminal nucleus, and may be missing in some species. The radula is absent in the genus Zemacies.

Genera

 Antarctospira Kantor, Harasewych & Puillandre, 2016 
 ? Apaturris Iredale, 1917
 Aphanitoma Bellardi, 1875
 Asthenotoma Harris & Burrows, 1891
 Austroturris Laseron, 1954
 Awateria Suter, 1917
 Bathytoma Harris & Burrows, 1891
 Belaturricula Powell, 1951
 Borsonella Dall, 1908
 Borsonellopsis McLean, 1971
 Borsonia Bellardi, 1839
 Cordieria Rouault, 1848
 Darbya Bartsch, 1934
 Diptychophlia Berry, 1964
 Drilliola Locard, 1897
 Filodrillia Hedley, 1922
 Genota H. Adams & A. Adams, 1853
 Glyptaesopus Pilsbry & Olsson, 1941
 Heteroturris Powell, 1967
 Maoritomella Powell, 1942
 Microdrillia Casey, 1903
 Ophiodermella Bartsch, 1944
 Paraborsonia Pilsbry, 1922
 Phenatoma Finlay, 1924
 Pulsarella Laseron, 1954
 Retidrillia McLean, 2000
 Suavodrillia Dall, 1918
 Tomopleura Casey, 1904
 Tropidoturris Kilburn, 1986
 Typhlodaphne Powell, 1951
 Typhlomangelia G.O. Sars, 1878
 Zemacies Finlay, 1926

Genera brought into synonymy 
 Acrobela Thiele, 1925 : synonym of Microdrillia Casey, 1903
 Acropota F. Nordsieck, 1977: synonym of Microdrillia Casey, 1903
 Boettgeria Peyrot, 1931 : synonym of Boettgeriola Wenz, 1943
 Boettgeriola Wenz, 1943 : synonym of Borsonia Bellardi, 1839
 Genotia P. Fischer, 1883 : synonym of Genota H. Adams & A. Adams, 1853
 Micantapex Iredale, 1936 : synonym of Bathytoma Harris & Burrows, 1891
 Narraweena (gastropod) Laseron, 1954 : synonym of Maoritomella Powell, 1942
 Oligotoma Bellardi, 1875 : synonym of Asthenotoma Harris & Burrows, 1891
 Parabathytoma Shuto, 1961 : synonym of Bathytoma Harris & Burrows, 1891
 Riuguhdrillia Oyama, 1951 : synonym of Bathytoma Harris & Burrows, 1891
 Vexithara Finlay, 1926 : synonym of Typhlomangelia G.O. Sars, 1878
 Viridoturris Powell, 1964 : synonym of Typhlomangelia G.O. Sars, 1878

References

External links
 Gastropods.com: Borsoniidae; accessed : 12 August 2011
 
 Worldwide Mollusc Species Data Base: Borsoniidae

 
Conoidea